Discohainesia is a genus of fungi in the family Dermateaceae. This is a monotypic genus, containing the single species Discohainesia oenotherae which is a plant pathogen infecting caneberrie, strawberries and geraniums.

See also 
 List of Dermateaceae genera

References

External links 
 Discohainesia at Index Fungorum

Dermateaceae genera
Monotypic Leotiomycetes genera
Fungal strawberry diseases
Small fruit diseases
Ornamental plant pathogens and diseases